Pia Maria Nalli (10 February 1886 – 27 September 1964) was an Italian mathematician known for her work on the summability of Fourier series, on Morera's theorem for analytic functions of several variables and for finding the solution to the Fredholm integral equation of the third kind for the first time. Her research interests ranged from algebraic geometry to functional analysis and tensor analysis; she was a speaker at the 1928 International Congress of Mathematicians.

She is also remembered for her struggles against discrimination against women in the Italian university hiring system. A street in Rome is named after her.

Life and academic career

Early life and education
Nalli was born on February 10, 1886, in Palermo, to a middle-class family with seven children. She studied at the University of Palermo, where she obtained a laurea in 1910 under the supervision of Giuseppe Bagnera, with a thesis concerning algebraic geometry, and in the same year joined the Circolo Matematico di Palermo.

After finishing her studies, Nalli assisted Bagnera in Palermo in 1911 and then began working as a school teacher. She completed a habilitation thesis in 1914 on the theory of integrals, and continued to work on Fourier analysis and Dirichlet series for the next several years.

Academic career

Nalli served as assistant to Giuseppe Bagnera at the University of Palermo from 1 April 1911 to 16 November 1911. She then taught at a number of secondary schools, first in the girls' school at Avellino, then in Trapani, and from 16 November 1912 in the girls' technical school in Palermo. During this time Nalli continued her research, completing her thesis "Esposizione e confronto critico delle diverse definizioni proposte per l'integrale definito di una funzione limitata o no", a study of the theory of the integral based on recent work on the subject by Émile Borel, Henri Lebesgue Charles de la Vallée Poussin, Giuseppe Vitali and Arnaud Denjoy.

In 1921, Nalli became extraordinary professor at the University of Cagliari. She had been ranked second to Mauro Picone in the competition for the position, possibly in part because she was female, but Picone chose to stay at the University of Catania and become head of mathematics there, so the Cagliari position fell to Nalli. In 1923, she was listed first in a search for a position at the University of Pavia, but not offered the position. Finally, after similar mistreatment from several other universities, she moved to the University of Catania as a full professor in 1927. At around this time, perhaps encouraged by Tullio Levi-Civita, she switched her research focus from functional analysis to tensor calculus.

She was an invited speaker at the International Congress of Mathematicians in 1928.

Death and legacy
Nalli died on 27 September 1964, in Catania. A street in Rome, the Via Pia Nalli, is named after her.

Selected works
Pia Nalli published 61 mathematical works, including the monograph  and a textbook. Her "Selected works"  include this monograph plus eleven articles on topics mainly belonging to functional and mathematical analysis: the following list includes also her doctoral thesis  and other works on tensor calculus
.
. 
.
.
.
.

Notes

References

Biographical and general references
.
.
.

Scientific references
. A survey paper describing the development of infinitesimal calculus during the twentieth century and trying to trace possible scenarios for its future evolution.
. A survey paper describing the development of mathematical analysis in Italy during the two world wars, describing the contributions of several Italian scientists who worked during that period.

External links

1886 births
1964 deaths
20th-century  Italian mathematicians
Mathematicians from Sicily
Mathematical analysts
Functional analysts
University of Palermo alumni
Academic staff of the University of Cagliari
Academic staff of the University of Catania
Scientists from Palermo
20th-century women mathematicians